Jovan Jovanov is a Macedonian-Canadian music producer, record engineer and songwriter of pop, R&B, house, and hip-hop. Now based in Toronto, Ontario, Jovanov is working with Canadian artists such as Alx Veliz, NorthSideBenji, Liron, and many others. Macedonian audience knows Jovanov as a singer and composer of many hit songs performed by artists such a Toše Proeski, Elvir Mekic, Adrian Gaxha, Слаткаристика, Toni Zen, Next Time and many others. Jovanov has composed, written, and produced over 700 songs and received many awards and acknowledgments. Internationally his hits have over 200 million views on YouTube.

He represented Macedonia as songwriter on the Eurovision song contest in 2004 (song "Life" for Toše Proeski) and in 2009 (song "Nešto što ḱe ostane" for Next Time), and on the Junior Eurovision Song Contest in 2008 (song "Prati Mi SMS" for Bobi Andonov). He also arranged Vlatko Ilievski's song for the Eurovision Song Contest 2011.

Jovanov has won three first prizes on the Macedonian festival MakFest, with his compositions "Magija", performed by the music group Magija (1998), "Ti me sakash", performed by Jovan Jovanov and Maja Sazdanovska (2005), and "Ne planiram", performed by Lambe Alabakovski (2010). He has also won two second prizes on MakFest for the compositions "300 godini", performed by Adrian Gaxha (2005) and "Bez tebe tivko umiram", performed by Next time (2008). Moreover, he is the winner of third prizes for the compositions "Da te vidam pak", performed by Jovan Jovanov (2003), "Se na svoe mesto", performed by Zoran Stamenkovski (2006) and "Nekade posle 2" performed by Elvir Mekic (2007).

Early life
Jovanov was born in Skopje . He began his music education when he was six years old. He plays the piano, guitar, and percussion instruments.

Career

Artist Career (2004-2009)
Jovanov recorded and released two CDs, "Na moj Nacin" (On May Way), "Into mi trebas" (I need Immediately) and performed in numerous concerts and performances around Macedonia.

Festival Director Makfest (2011-2012)
Jovanov was for two years director of the biggest festival of pop music in Macedonia - "MakFest" held in Stip. Makfest has produced more than 1,000 songs, many of which were hits.

Global Music Entertainment Corp - Toronto, Canada (2017–present)
The G.M.E. was founded by Award Winning Producer Jovan Jovanov. Global Music Entertainment has a team of expert industry professionals and has a blueprint plan for an aspiring singer to break into the music industry as an independent or signed recording artist.

The G.M.E. is a unique all-in-one artist development facility that will prepare aspiring singers for a career in the music business. It is the leading source of training for artists in the music industry in Toronto, and a model for industry training nationwide.  A place you can call your own, the center provides artist development programs, A & R consultations, marketing, social media and branding assistance, a recording studio, master vocal classes, performance and stage training, choreographers, songwriting, and music lessons to bring out the creative artist in you.

Global Music Entertainment Corp is owner of Global Recording Studio Toronot

Discography

Awards and nominations

Awards

References

21st-century Macedonian male singers
Living people
Macedonian pop singers
Macedonian record producers
Musicians from Skopje
North Macedonia emigrants to Canada
1985 births